Kim Delaney (born November 29, 1961) is an American actress known for her starring role as Detective Diane Russell on the ABC drama television series NYPD Blue, for which she won an Emmy Award. Early in her career, she played the role of Jenny Gardner in the ABC daytime television drama All My Children. She later had leading roles in the short lived TV drama Philly, part of the first season of CSI: Miami, and the first six seasons of Army Wives. She also appeared in Tour of Duty, Season 2 and the first two episodes of Season 3, playing a writer during the Vietnam War named Alex Devlin.

Early life
Delaney, an Irish American, was born in Philadelphia, Pennsylvania, to Joan and Jack Delaney, the only daughter of five children. Delaney's mother was a homemaker and her father a senior union official in the United Auto Workers. She was raised Roman Catholic. Delaney has brothers Ed, John, Keith and Patrick. While she was attending J. W. Hallahan Catholic Girls High School, she worked as a model for the Elite agency. Upon graduation, she went to New York and found employment there as a model. At the same time, she studied acting with William Esper.

Career
Delaney first became known for her stint as innocent teenager Jenny Gardner Nelson on the soap opera All My Children, which also was her first job. She played the character from August 1981 to August 1984, earning a 1983 Daytime Emmy Award nomination, as well as a loyal fan base; a profile of the actress a decade later noted,"Delaney left the soap in 1984, but fans still remember her as Jenny. 'They come up and will say they've followed everything I've done, and they stopped watching the show after I left, and they're so happy to see me on NYPD Blue, because they love the character.'"

After leaving All My Children, Delaney began acting in feature films. In 1985, she appeared with Emilio Estevez in That Was Then... This Is Now, a film version of the S. E. Hinton novel of the same name. In 1986, she played a young nun in the military action movie The Delta Force, starring Chuck Norris. In 1987, Delaney was cast as Amanda Jones in Some Kind of Wonderful opposite Peter Gallagher, but new director Howard Deutch recast both roles with his future wife Lea Thompson and Craig Sheffer before filming. Also in 1987, she appeared both as Jessie in Christmas Comes to Willow Creek, and as associate attorney Leslie Kleinberg during the 2nd season of L.A. Law. In 1988, Delaney starred in the thriller The Drifter. In 1994, she appeared in the film The Force.

In 1988, Delaney became a regular on the CBS television series Tour of Duty. After leaving the show in 1989 to give birth to her son with husband Joseph Cortese, her character was killed in an explosion—just as her All My Children character had died five years earlier.

In the years immediately following her departure from her two early television series, her film and TV roles tended to be few and of low quality, in the opinion of both the critics and the actress herself. A 1996 profile article in Entertainment Weekly, on the occasion of her landing a prestigious television role at the end of this period, noted:"Delaney's résumé is spotted with ridiculous roles that range from a nun in the Chuck Norris action movie, The Delta Force, to a possessed nymphomaniac in the soft-core horror film, Temptress. 'There's a lot of things I did to pay the mortgage,' Delaney says resignedly."Roles from this period include her 1992 appearance as Lucky Santangelo in the television miniseries, Lady Boss.

In 1995, Delaney began portraying NYPD Blue Detective Diane Russell. Originally slated for only four episodes, the role became permanent after her character's relationship with Detective Bobby Simone (Jimmy Smits) became a hit with viewers. In this role, she was nominated three times for the Primetime Emmy Award for Outstanding Supporting Actress in a Drama Series, winning at the 1997 Emmy Awards.

In 2001, NYPD Blue producer Steven Bochco chose Delaney for the lead in the new television series Philly and she was written out of NYPD Blue. Despite critical acclaim, the show lasted only one season.

In 2002, Delaney was the female lead on the new CBS drama series CSI: Miami, a spin-off of sorts from the hit CSI: Crime Scene Investigation. She was written off the series after just 10 episodes; Entertainment Weekly suggested that it had been due to a lack of chemistry between Delaney and star David Caruso.

After briefly returning in 5 episodes of NYPD Blue (one at the end of season 10 and a four-episode story arc mid-way through Season 11), Delaney starred in the 2004 NBC miniseries 10.5, and its 2006 sequel, 10.5: Apocalypse. The following year, she began a recurring role on The O.C. In 2006, Delaney starred in an episode of Nightmares & Dreamscapes: From the Stories of Stephen King titled "You Know They Got a Hell of a Band," about Rock and Roll Heaven. Delaney next appeared twice on Law & Order: Special Victims Unit in early 2007, guest-starring on the episodes "Philadelphia" and "Florida".

Delaney played the main role of Claudia Joy Holden on the Lifetime Television series Army Wives. In November 2012, a few weeks after the end of season six, it was announced that Delaney would not be returning for the show's seventh season, with a short storyline that her character had died.

In early 2016, Delaney was cast in God Bless the Broken Road, a feature film based on the song of the same name. It was released in the United States on September 7, 2018. In September 2020, Delaney joined the cast of General Hospital in the role of Jackie Templeton; she made her first appearance on October 6.

Personal life
Delaney has been married and divorced twice. She married actor Charles Grant, also known as Charles Flohe, on July 22, 1984. Her second marriage, to actor Joseph Cortese from 1989 to 1994, produced a son named Jack, born circa 1990. She was engaged for a time to producer Alan Barnette.

Like her character in her breakout role on the television series NYPD Blue, Delaney has struggled with alcoholism. In 2002, Delaney was arrested in Malibu, California, for suspicion of drunk driving after she refused to take a breathalyzer test. She subsequently pleaded no contest and was sentenced to two years' probation, fined, and ordered to take a defensive driving course. In 2003, after being dropped from the cast of CSI: Miami, Delaney checked herself into an alcohol rehab center. In 2005, she lost custody of her then 15-year-old son after endangering his life by forcing him to ride with her when she drove while intoxicated, which her son testified was not the first such incident. In 2011, Delaney was pulled from the stage before finishing a long, slurred, odd speech at an award ceremony recognizing the work of former United States Secretary of Defense Robert Gates.

Filmography

Film

Television

References

External links

 
 

1961 births
Living people
American film actresses
American soap opera actresses
American television actresses
American people of Irish descent
Outstanding Performance by a Supporting Actress in a Drama Series Primetime Emmy Award winners
Actresses from Philadelphia
20th-century American actresses
21st-century American actresses